Yale station is an light rail station in Denver, Colorado, United States. It is served by the E and H Lines, operated by the Regional Transportation District (RTD), and was opened on November 17, 2006. The station features a series of public art murals  entitled Connected, which was created by Gregory Gove and dedicated in 2007.

References 

RTD light rail stations in Denver
Railway stations in the United States opened in 2006
2006 establishments in Colorado